An  is a guardian god or spirit of a particular place in the Shinto religion of Japan.  The ujigami was prayed to for a number of reasons, including protection from sickness, success in endeavors, and good harvests.

History 

The ujigami is thought to have been more important only since the eighth century. 

In its current form, the term ujigami is used to describe several other types of Shinto deities. Originally, the term ujigami referred to a family god. It is believed that, at first, these deities were worshiped at temporary altars. After the Heian period, the Japanese manorial system was established and nobles, warriors and temples had their own private land, the family-based society fell out of use, and belief in ujigami diminished. In turn, the lords of the manors began to pray to the deities to protect their land. In the Muromachi period the manorial system declined, and so the guardian deities were enshrined along with the ujigami. An  is a god of the land of one's birth. Over time, the ubusunagami and chinju came to be seen as the heart of the community, and were eventually referred to as ujigami.

Ujiko
The term  is used to describe a person who worships an ujigami.

Usually, the relationship between Ujigami and Ujiko arises from entering the Ujigami at the birthplace of the Ujigami or at a local shrine. In many cases, the Ubusunagami is often used as the Ujigami, just as the shrine visit is performed on the Ubusunagami, the god of the land where he was born. 

The custom of visiting a shrine and becoming a parishioner varies, but in many cases, it involves visiting a shrine after the distinction between a god of origin and a god of worship has diminished. Upon visiting a shrine, it is common to receive a proof of childhood card, indicating one's status as a parishioner. However, for those who do not have a familial connection to the worship of the Ujigami, or have not participated in festivals for generations, visiting the shrine may simply be a customary act without a strong conscious understanding of the Ujigami.

Additionally, the ritual of becoming a parishioner may be performed again following a marriage, to align with the Ujigami of the spouse's family. In recent years, the aging of festival participants and a decrease in children participating in festivals has been observed. In many cases, the offering of worship is limited to within the household.

See also
 Chinjugami
 Glossary of Shinto
 Sorei
 Ubusunagami
 Uji (clan)
 Hitogami

References

Further reading

Hambrick, Charles H. "Tradition and Modernity in the New Religious Movements of Japan." Japanese Journal of Religious Studies 1 (1974): 217–52. JSTOR. Web. 21 Sept. 2010.
Teeuwen, Mark, John Breen, and Ito Satoshi. "Shinto and the Populace: the Spread of Ritual and Teachings." Shinto, a Short History. New York: New York Taylor & Francis, 2003. 126. NetLibrary. Web. 21 Sept. 2010. 
Hiroshi, Iwai. "Kami in Folk Religion : Ujigami." Encyclopedia of Shinto - Home. Kokugakuin University, 13 Mar. 2005. Web. 21 Sept. 2010. <http://eos.kokugakuin.ac.jp/modules/xwords/entry.php?entryID=231>.
"Religion and Spiritual Development: Japan." Martial Arts of the World. Santa Barabara: ABC-CLIO, 2001. Credo Reference. Web. 7 October 2010
Earhart, Bryon H. "A Branch Meeting in Suburban Tokyo: "I" Branch." Gedatsu-Kai and Religion in Contemporary Japan: Returning to the Center. Bloomington Indiana UP, 1989. 122–27. NetLibrary. Web. 21 Sept. 2010.

Tutelary deities
Japanese folk religion
Shinto shrines
Japanese gods
Shinto
Shinto kami
Shinto terminology